Andoni Cedrún Ibarra (born 5 June 1960) is a Spanish retired footballer who played as a goalkeeper.

He appeared in 351 La Liga matches over 17 seasons, representing mostly Zaragoza with which he won three major titles, including the 1995 Cup Winners' Cup. He started his career with Athletic Bilbao.

Club career
Born in Durango, Biscay, Cedrún was a youth product at Athletic Bilbao, and managed to appear in 21 first-team matches in his first professional season, at only 20. This was prior to the promotion of another Lezama graduate, legendary Andoni Zubizarreta, which then left him two years without any La Liga appearances.

After a sole season at Cádiz CF (only 15 games and top-flight relegation), Cedrún joined fellow league side Real Zaragoza in the summer of 1984. He proceeded to play 144 times in the league in his first four years, adding five matches in the team's victorious campaign in the UEFA Cup Winners' Cup in 1994–95.

For the 1988–89 campaign, the Aragonese signed Paraguayan José Luis Chilavert and Cedrún would be again second-choice for two seasons. However, he managed to bounce back at age 30, going on to start again in the following three.

From 1993 onwards, Cedrún began facing some competition from Real Madrid youth graduate Juanmi and, after no league appearances to his credit in 1995–96, left for a single top-tier campaign at lowly CD Logroñés, retiring subsequently.

Personal life
Cedrún's father, Carmelo, was also a footballer and a goalkeeper. He too represented Athletic but with more success, playing more than 400 competitive matches in the 50s/60s.

His nephew, Markel Areitio, is also a goalkeeper.

Honours
Zaragoza
Copa del Rey: 1985–86, 1993–94
UEFA Cup Winners' Cup: 1994–95

References

External links

1960 births
Living people
People from Durango, Biscay
Sportspeople from Biscay
Spanish footballers
Footballers from the Basque Country (autonomous community)
Association football goalkeepers
La Liga players
Segunda División B players
Bilbao Athletic footballers
Athletic Bilbao footballers
Cádiz CF players
Real Zaragoza players
CD Logroñés footballers
Spain youth international footballers
Spain under-21 international footballers
Basque Country international footballers